The 1994 Asian Junior Athletics Championships was the fifth edition of the international athletics competition for Asian under-20 athletes, organised by the Asian Athletics Association. It took place from 17–20 September in Jakarta, Indonesia. It was the second time that the Indonesian capital had hosted the competition, following on from the first edition in 1986. A total of 41 events were contested, 22 for male athletes and 19 for female athletes.

Medal summary

Men

Women

1994 Medal Table

References

Results
Asian Junior Championships 1994. World Junior Athletics History. Retrieved on 2013-10-19.

External links
Asian Athletics official website

Asian Junior Championships
Asian Junior Athletics Championships
International athletics competitions hosted by Indonesia
Sport in Jakarta
Asian Junior Athletics Championships
Asian Junior Athletics Championships
1994 in youth sport